Our Lady of Suyapa (Spanish: Nuestra Señora de Suyapa), also known as the Virgin of Suyapa (Spanish: Virgen de Suyapa), is a title of the Virgin Mary, mother of Jesus Christ. An 18th-century cedar wood statue (6 cm/2.3 in) of the Virgin is perhaps Honduras' most popular religious image, and the focus of an extensive pilgrimage.

The statue is kept in the Basílica de Suyapa in Suyapa, a suburb of the capital Tegucigalpa, and toured through various other parts of Honduras each year in early February. Many thousands of people from all over Central America make pilgrimages to visit the statue on her name day, February 3, a commemoration of the day she was found in 1747. The statue has been stolen and then recovered on two occasions. Our Lady of Suyapa is the Patroness of Honduras.

Discovery

There are several different versions of how the statue of the Virgin of Suyapa was discovered.

Many Hondurans believe the statue was miraculously discovered in late January or early February 1747 by a labourer, Alejandro Colindres. Colindres and an 8-year-old boy had been sent by Colindres's mother to clear some cornfields on Piligüin mountain, northeast of Tegucigalpa. On the way back, they were overtaken by nightfall and decided to sleep outside. During the night, Colindres was awakened by a sharp pain in his side, and discovered that he was sleeping on something. Later versions of the story claim that without looking at the object, Colindres threw it as far away as he could, only to find it underneath him as he lay down again.  This detail, however, is not present in early versions of the story.  The next morning, Colindres discovered that he had been sleeping on a tiny statue of the Blessed Virgin Mary, which he took home with him and set up on the family altar in his mother's house. There it remained for the next 20 years.

By 1777, a chapel was constructed for the statue. The first shrine of our Lady of Suyapa was blessed in 1780. The first notable attested miracle occurred in 1796.

The statue has been stolen twice. In 1986 it was stolen and stripped of its gold, silver, and jewels, and left in the men's room of the restaurant La Terrraza de Don Pepe in Tegucigalpa.

Description
La Morenita (the Dear Dark One) is carved in cedar wood, and measures less than 2.5 inches in size. It is believed that the carving is very old, and possibly done as a devotional item by an unknown, amateur artist.  She has an oval face and straight, shoulder length hair.  Her hands are joined in prayer and she wears a light pink robe. The statue is covered by a dark cloak trimmed with golden stars and adorned with valuable jewels.

Veneration
In 1925, Pope Pius XI declared her Patroness of Honduras under the title Our Lady of Suyapa, and selected February 3 as her feast day. In 1954, a large Basilica was built next to the chapel.  The statue of the Virgin spends most of her time in the chapel, but every year before the celebration of her festival, the statue is moved into the larger church to accommodate the crowds.

The statue is considered to have miraculous powers. The swift ending of the Football War between Honduras and El Salvador is attributed to the statue. Many of the Honduran soldiers involved reported visions of the Virgin, which calmed their fears during the fighting. In 1969 The Virgin of Suyapa was declared Captain General of the Armed Forces of Honduras.

The statue of the Virgin of Suyapa has a group of lay caretakers, all male, known as the Orden de los Caballeros de Suyapa, founded in the 20th century.  They are responsible for caring for the image, and the small chapel.  They escort the statue whenever it leaves the chapel to travel around Honduras, as it often does every February.

See also 
 Religion in Honduras

References

Sources
 Barceló Morey, Jose. 2000. La Inmaculada Concepción de María en Honduras: La Inmaculada Concepción de Suyapa, Patrona de Honduras.  San Pedro Sula:  Editorial/Librería Coello
 Valladares B., Juan R. 1946. La Virgen de Suyapa (historia documentada).  Tegucigalpa: Tallereres Tipo-Lito.

External links
Official Catholic church site Spanish
Virgin of Suyapa visits Honduran suburb devastated by massacre
 Article in Spanish on sources of the story

Patron saints
Honduran culture
Latin American folklore